Manuel Federico Hidalgo Gasparini (born 3 May 1999) is an Argentine professional footballer who plays as a winger for Malaysia Super League club Kedah Darul Aman. Occasionally, he is deployed as a midfielder or striker.

Career

Ferro Carril Oeste
At the age of 15, Hidalgo trained with the first team of Argentine club Ferro Carril Oeste.

Benfica
In 2016, he signed for S.L. Benfica, the most successful club in Portugal, after trialing with English Premier League side Tottenham Hotspur.

Triestina
In 2018, he signed for U.S. Triestina Calcio 1918 in the Italian third division.

Sheffield Wednesday
In winter 2020, Hidalgo signed for English Championship team Sheffield Wednesday on an 18-month contract. However, he terminated his contract with six months remaining, citing the death of Argentina international Diego Maradona as one of the reasons behind the decision.

Sri Pahang
On 5 May 2021, he joined Malaysian Super League club Sri Pahang. He scored his first goal on his debut for the club in a 2–2 home match draw against rival Selangor FC.

References

External links
 
 Manuel Hidalgo at playmakerstats.com (English version of ceroacero.es)

Living people
1999 births
Argentine footballers
Association football midfielders
Association football wingers
Serie C players
Malaysia Super League players
U.S. Triestina Calcio 1918 players
Sri Pahang FC players
Argentine expatriate footballers
Argentine expatriate sportspeople in Italy
Expatriate footballers in Italy
Argentine expatriate sportspeople in England
Expatriate footballers in England
Argentine expatriate sportspeople in Malaysia
Expatriate footballers in Malaysia
Kedah Darul Aman F.C. players